The 2019 Nigerian Senate election in Abia State was held on February 23, 2019, to elect members of the Nigerian Senate to represent Abia State. Enyinnaya Abaribe representing Abia South and Theodore Orji representing Abia Central won on the platform of Peoples Democratic Party, while Orji Uzor Kalu representing Abia North won on the platform of All Progressives Congress.

Overview

Summary

Results

Abia South 
A total of 13 candidates registered with the Independent National Electoral Commission to contest in the election. PDP candidate Enyinnaya Abaribe won the election, defeating APGA Chris Nkwota and 11 other party candidates. Abaribe pulled 53,086 votes, while APGA candidate Nkwota scored 27,998.

Abia Central 
A total of 15 candidates registered with the Independent National Electoral Commission to contest in the election. PDP candidate and former governor of Abia state Theodore Orji won the election, defeating APC Nkechi Nwaogu and 13 other party candidates. Orji pulled 55,461 votes, while APC candidate Sen. Nkechi Nwaogu scored 29,860  and All Progressive Grand Alliance (APGA) candidate Chidi Ajaegbu scored 19,534 votes to clinch the third position.

Abia North 
A total of 16 candidates registered with the Independent National Electoral Commission to contest in the election. APC candidate and former Governor of Abia state, Chief Orji Uzor Kalu won the election, defeating PDP incumbent, Ohuabunwa. Kalu pulled 31,203 votes while his closest rival Mao Ohuabunwa pulled 20,801 votes and APGA candidate Chief David Ogba scored 11,410 votes

References 

Abia State senatorial elections
2019 Abia State elections
Abia State Senate elections
February 2019 events in Nigeria